De Avonturen van Pietje Bell is a 1964 Dutch film directed by Henk van der Linden.

Cast
 Jeu Consten as Pietje Bell
 Cor van der Linden as Engeltje
 Hans Bost as Peentje
 No Bours as Pietje's father
 Lies Bours as Pietje's mother
 Hub Consten as policeofficer
 Frits Wenkop as Klok
 Herman Lutgerink as Teun
 Thea Eyssen as aunt Cato
 Toon van Loon as barber Wip

External links 
 

Dutch children's films
Dutch comedy films
1964 films
Dutch black-and-white films
Films based on children's books
Films based on Dutch novels
Films shot in the Netherlands
1960s Dutch-language films